"The Garden of Eden" is a song written and composed by Dennise Haas Norwood, and first recorded by Joe Valino, which reached Number 12 on the Billboard chart in October 1956.
Valino recorded the song at his second session for Vik Records, a subsidiary of RCA. "I knew it would be a hit, even as I was recording it," he told Wayne Jancik in The Billboard Book of One-Hit Wonders.

In the UK the most popular version was recorded by the singer Frankie Vaughan, and gave him his first No. 1 hit in the United Kingdom in early 1957. The song first entered the UK Singles Chart on 11 January 1957, spent four weeks at the top, and 13 weeks in the charts all together. Gary Miller also released his version in the UK around the same time, and it reached No. 14 on the chart.

Other versions of the song have also been recorded by Dick James and Paul Raven.

References

1956 songs
1957 singles
UK Singles Chart number-one singles